The Eoarchean (also spelled Eoarchaean) is the first era of the Archean Eon of the geologic record. It spans 400 million years, from the end of the Hadean Eon 4 billion years ago (4000 Mya) to the start of the Paleoarchean Era 3600 Mya. The beginnings of life on Earth have been dated to this era and evidence of cyanobacteria date to 3500 Mya, comparatively shortly after the Eoarchean. At that time, the atmosphere was without oxygen and the pressure values ranged from 10 to 100 bar (around 10 to 100 times the atmospheric pressure today).

Chronology
The Eoarchean Era was formerly officially unnamed and informally referred to as the first part of the Early Archean Eon (which is now an obsolete name) alongside the Paleoarchean Era.

The International Commission on Stratigraphy now officially recognizes the Eoarchean Era as the
first part of the Archaean Eon, preceded by the Hadean Eon, during which the Earth is believed to have been essentially molten.

The Eoarchaean's lower boundary or starting point of 4 Gya (4 billion years ago) is officially recognized by the International Commission on Stratigraphy.

Geology

The beginning of the Eoarchean is characterized by heavy asteroid bombardment within the Inner Solar System: the Late Heavy Bombardment. The largest Eoarchean rock formation is the Isua Greenstone Belt on the south-west coast of Greenland, which dates from 3.8 billion years. The Acasta Gneiss within the Canadian Shield have been dated to be 4,031 Ma and are therefore the oldest preserved rock formations. In 2008, another rock formation was discovered in the Nuvvuagittuq Greenstone Belt in northern Québec, Canada which has been dated to be . These formations are presently under intense investigation.

Atmosphere
3,850 million years old Greenland apatite shows evidence of Carbon-12 enrichment. This has sparked a debate whether there might have been photosynthetic life before 3.8 billion years.

Proposed subdivisions
Eoarchean Era — 4031–3600 Mya
Acastan Period — 4031–3810 Mya
Isuan Period — 3810–3600 Mya

See also
Precambrian Supereon (4600-539 Mya)
Hadean Eon (4600-4000 Mya)
Archean Eon (4000-2500 Mya)
Paleoarchean Era (3600-3200 Mya)
Mesoarchean Era (3200-2800 Mya)
Neoarchean Era (2800-2500 Mya)
Proterozoic Eon (2500-539 Mya)

References

Further reading

External links

Taxonconcept.stratigraphy.ne: A short fact sheet on the Eoarchean
Eoarchean (chronostratigraphy scale)

01
Geological eras
Precambrian geochronology